Dedworth is the most westerly area of Windsor in Berkshire, England.

History
The name Dedworth is formed from the words 'Dydda', a man's name, and 'Worth', a Saxon word for enclosure. An irregular quadrangula moat in Wolf Lane may be all that remains of the manor house of Dedworth Maunsell. The other manor in the area was Dedworth Loring, owned by the De Loring family from the time of Peter De Loring, in the early 13th century. It was possibly located to the north, where a large medieval hearth has been uncovered in the aptly named Knight's Close.
Dedworth was one of three Saxon villages (the other two being Clewer and Losfield) that Windsor expanded to encompass. Dedworth predates Windsor and is mentioned in the Domesday Book as Dideorde.

Geography
Dedworth has a  local nature reserve called Sutherland Grange The parish church of All Saints is the work of G. F. Bodley (1863). It has stained glass windows by Edward Burne-Jones, William Morris, Ford Madox Brown and D. G. Rossetti (1863–87). Dedworth has a number of shops: The Co-operative, Boots Pharmacy, Tesco, Model Shop and many others. There are some places to get food too such as Adis grill, Papa John's and China Garden to name a few.

References

External links

Royal Borough of Windsor and Maidenhead
Windsor, Berkshire